The 2013–14 Hong Kong Third Division League is the 63rd season of Hong Kong Third Division League, the third-tier football league in Hong Kong organised by the Hong Kong Football Association.

The season began 8 September 2013 and ended on 27 April 2014.

Teams

Changes from last season

From Third Division League
Promoted to Second Division League
 Wong Tai Sin
 Lucky Mile
 Kwun Tong
 Kwai Tsing

Relegated to Fourth Division League
 Fukien

To Third Division League
Relegated from Second Division League
 Sham Shui Po

Promoted from Fourth Division League
 Yau Tsim Mong
 Mutual
 Kwong Wah
 Sun Source

Team review
The 2013–14 season of the Hong Kong Third Division League consists of 14 clubs, including 9 sides from the 2012–13 season, 1 team relegated from 2012–13 Second Division and 4 teams promoted from 2012–13 Fourth Division.

The detail of the clubs is as follows.

League table

Positions by round

Results

Fixtures and results

Round 1

Round 2

Round 3

Remark: Week 3 matches are cancelled and postponed due to typhoon. Matches will be rescheduled soon.

Round 4

Round 5

Round 6

Round 7

Round 8

Round 9

Round 10

Round 11

Round 12

Round 13

Round 14

Round 15

Round 16

Round 17

Round 18

Round 19

Round 20

Round 21

Round 22

Round 23

Round 24

Round 25

Round 26

References

3
Hong Kong Third Division League seasons